Primacy of Jerusalem may refer to:

 Primacy of Jerusalem in Judaism, religious and cultural primacy of the Holy City of Jerusalem, in Judaism
 Primacy of Jerusalem in Christianity, ecclesiological doctrine on the primacy of the Holy See of Jerusalem

See also
 Primacy (disambiguation)
 Religious significance of Jerusalem